Mauro Ezequiel Carabajal-Lopez (born 7 May 1978) is an Argentinian football (soccer) player.

Career

Born in Rosario, he begin playing with Defensores Unidos from where in 1995 moved to CA Rosario Central.

In January 1999, he moved, on loan, to the Serbian club FK Vojvodina together with another Argentinian player, Hernán Marcos. The 1998–99 season of the First League of FR Yugoslavia was interrupted by the end of March due to the NATO bombing of FR Yugoslavia. After the players had been told by the club officials that they could begin their holidays earlier, since that season was not going to be played any longer, and was declared finished with the standings found in the time of interruption as definitive, some players, and Carabajal among them, refused to leave, as a show of solidarity. That act is highly regarded by the FK Vojvodina club supporters.

After having played one season for the Spanish Second League club Recreativo Huelva Carabajal moved to Mexico and played with Real Huastecos, Jaibos Tampico Madero and San Luis Potosi.  Then, he continued his career in the United States playing with West Michigan Edge. In 2004, he signed with USL A-League side Syracuse Salty Dogs in their last season before being dissolved. In 2005, he moved to USL First Division club Rochester Raging Rhinos. Since 2007, he has played in another American club, the Deportivo Lempira.

References

External sources
Profile at BDFA (Base de Datos del Fútbol Argentino)
Stats for 2005 season in Section132.com

1978 births
Argentine footballers
Argentine expatriate footballers
Footballers from Rosario, Santa Fe
Argentine Primera División players
Rosario Central footballers
FK Vojvodina players
Argentine expatriate sportspeople in Serbia
Expatriate footballers in Serbia and Montenegro
Recreativo de Huelva players
Expatriate footballers in Spain
Expatriate footballers in Mexico
West Michigan Edge players
Syracuse Salty Dogs players
Rochester New York FC players
USL League Two players
A-League (1995–2004) players
USL First Division players
Expatriate soccer players in the United States
Association football forwards
Argentine expatriate sportspeople in Spain
Argentine expatriate sportspeople in the United States
Living people
Argentine expatriate sportspeople in Mexico